This list is of the Historic Sites of Japan located within the Prefecture of Okayama.

National Historic Sites
As of 6 August 2019, forty-seven Sites have been designated as being of national significance (including one *Special Historic Site); the Joseon Mission Sites includes sites in Hiroshima and Shizuoka Prefectures.

|}

Prefectural Historic Sites
As of 6 August 2019, sixty Sites have been designated as being of prefectural importance.

Municipal Historic Sites
As of 1 May 2018, a further four hundred and sixty-two Sites have been designated as being of municipal importance.

See also
 Cultural Properties of Japan
 Bitchū, Bizen and Mimasaka Provinces
 Okayama Prefectural Museum
 List of Places of Scenic Beauty of Japan (Okayama)
 List of Cultural Properties of Japan - paintings (Okayama)
 List of Cultural Properties of Japan - historical materials (Okayama)

References

External links
  Properties in Okayama Prefecture

Okayama Prefecture
 Okayama